Benjamin Scott Maio Mackay (born 9 September 1999) is an Australian actor, director, writer, comedian, podcaster and musician. He is the artistic director of Preachrs Podcast OnLine & OnStage and hosts the entertainment podcast Benjamin Maio Mackay's Talk 2 Me!

Career 
Mackay is the founder and artistic director of Preachrs Podcast OnLine & OnStage; a production company that specialises in producing innovative digital and theatrical content.

Preachrs Podcast started as a Doctor Who podcast, which was successful and lead to Benjamin working for the Australian Broadcasting Corporation. The podcast turned into 4 live touring shows, produced, directed, written by and starring Benjamin. The shows were well received by audiences and critics alike. The shows toured Australia. The live shows also featured comedian Rob Lloyd.

Mackay went on to produce, adapt, direct and perform in the world premiere of Great Detectives of Old Time Radio Live. The show opened in the Adelaide Fringe 2015. A revised version of the show began its Australian tour Australia in 2016 to 5 star reviews. The tour will again star, be directed, produced and adapted by Benjamin. The tour has played Sydney, Adelaide, Mount Gambier and is returned to Adelaide in the 2017 Adelaide Fringe for Adelaide Oval. Benjamin was nominated for "Best Actor in a Play," "Best Director of a Play" for his work on Great Detectives of Old Time Radio Live. The show was also nominated for "Best Play" in the 2016 Broadway World Sydney Theatre Awards. The show is reportedly finishing its tour after the Adelaide return season in early 2017.

His podcast, Benjamin Maio Mackay's Talk 2 Me! is an entertainment chat show and has featured a wide range of celebrities. The podcast has a large following and also reviews films, theatre and DVDs on the podcast. The podcast has featured Zoë Wanamaker, David Yates, Harry Lloyd, Arthur Darvill, Midge Ure, Clive Standen, Kourtney Hansen, David Stratton, Vincent Rodriguez III, Brandon Victor Dixon, Anthony Rapp, Greg Grunberg, Claudia Wells, Enver Gjokaj, Ian Bohen, Natalia Tena, Will Smith (comedian), Stephen Hall (actor), Brian Krause, Jason Watkins (actor), Mark Collie, James Marshall (actor), Hudson Leick, Cody Christian, Steven Williams, Wil Travel, Kevin Brown (actor), Hugh Fraser (actor), Rob Mills, Daran Norris, Phil Davis (actor), Adam Hills, Jerome Flynn and many more.

In 2015 Preachrs Podcast OnLine & OnStage alongside Matthew Reilly announced an audio drama adaptation of Reilly's best-selling novel Ice Station. A live version, directed, adapted and produced by Maio Mackay was performed in 2016. "Matthew Reilly’s Ice Station Live" was performed in the Adelaide Fringe Festival 2016 and the live show piloted the first 3 episodes of the audio drama. Four cast members, including Maio Mackay appeared at Supanova Pop Culture convention to promote the project. It was well received by audiences and critics. It played 17 sold-out shows, but was ultimately not picked up for series.

Benjamin has worked extensively in theatre and musicals outside of his company, performing in more than 30 musicals and more than 50 plays. He is a trained pianist, singer and voice over artist.

Benjamin between 2016 and 2018 produced an audio drama version of the Australian series The Phoenix Files. He announced the project in conjunction with the author Chris Morphew in 2017. All 3, 3-hour instalments were released to audience and critical acclaim. A soundtrack album with an original score composed by Sean Braithwaite followed in late 2018. Maio Mackay produced, directed adapted and performed in the series. Paul McGann, Stephen Mahy, Kurt Phelan and Andrew Hansen starred alongside frequent Maio Mackay calibrators Jennifer Barry and Julia Sciacca. John Jarratt was cast and starred in the first two instalments, but was removed from the project as of August 26, 2018 following assault charges. He was replaced by Ben Sorensen in the final instalment.

Benjamin directed the professional premiere of Anne of Green Gables: The Musical in December 2018, starring West End performers Adrian Barnes and Deborah Caddy. Maio Mackay in 2019 traveled to Fringe World to work for several weeks, before returning to Adelaide for the Adelaide Fringe Festival. He directed and produced the original show Great Detectives 2!, a sequel to Great Detectives, the show received critical acclaim. He is also set to appear in a number of other shows across the 2019 Adelaide Fringe Festival, including a co-producing project with Radio personality Ben Sorensen. Across the 2019 Adelaide Fringe Festival he performed in a record 55 shows.

Personal life 

Mackay is an atheist. He is bisexual and has discussed his sexuality both in diversity panels and on an episode of his podcast with Maria Lewis. He has acknowledged the lack of bisexual representation is mainstream media and is a supporter of Stephanie Beatriz's Brooklyn Nine-Nine character, as well as the positive representation on Crazy Ex-Girlfriend.

Selected theatrical highlights 

 Peter Pan (2011, Actor)
 Shakespeare for Kids By Kids (2011, Actor)
 Seussical (2011, Actor)
 Oliver! (2011, Actor)
 100 Lunches (2011, Actor)
 All My Sons (2012, Actor)
 13! A New Musical (2012, Actor)
 The Not 24hr Show  (2012, Actor)
 50 Years of Doctor Who: Preachrs Podcast Live! (2013, Actor, Writer, Director, Producer)
 50 Years of Doctor Who: Preachrs Podcast Live 1.5! (2013, Actor, Writer, Director, Producer)
 Celebrating 50 Years of Dr Who. (2013, Actor, Host, Writer)
 50 Years of Doctor Who: Preachrs Podcast Live 2! (2014, Actor, Writer, Director, Producer)
 50 Years of Doctor Who: Preachrs Podcast Live @ Comic Con! (2014, Actor, Writer, Director, Producer)
 Great Detectives of Old Time Radio Live (2015, Actor, Adapter, Director, Producer)
 The Cripple of Inishmaan (2015, Actor)
 Matthew Reilly's Ice Station Live (2016, Actor, Adapter, Director, Producer)
 Great Detectives of Old Time Radio Live (2016/2017/2018 Tour, Actor, Adapter, Director, Producer)
 Anne of Green Gables: The Musical (2018, Director)
 Great Detectives 2! (2019, Director, Producer, Adapter, Actor)
 Sex and the Musical (2019, Actor)
 Late Night Panel Show (2019, Guest Comedian)
 Gameshow of Thrones (2019, Guest Comedian)
 #BunnyPastards - Hardly Trivial Trivia (2019, Comedian, co-director, Co-Producer, Co-Writer)
 Tales of Adventure (2019, Guest Improviser)
 Hutt St Centre Charity Variety Hour (2019, Host)

References

External links 
 
 Benjamin's ABC Host Profile from 2013

1999 births
Living people
Male actors from Adelaide
Writers from Adelaide
Australian radio writers
Australian theatre directors
Australian producers
Australian podcasters